Yanya is the Turkish language name for Ioannina.

Yanya may also refer to:

Yanya, Shandong, a town in Yiyuan County, Shandong, China
Yanya Subdistrict (雁崖街道), a subdistrict in Yungang District, Datong, Shanxi, China
Nilüfer Yanya (born 1996), British rock composer, singer and guitarist